Maximilian Thorwirth (born 9 January 1995) is a German long-distance runner. He competed in the 3000 metres at the 2022 World Athletics Indoor Championships.

References

1995 births
Living people
German male long-distance runners
Sportspeople from Düsseldorf
21st-century German people